Danuta Joppek is a Polish artist and painter. She was curator and co-organiser of some exhibitions in Poland and abroad, and the author of analytical texts about art.

Biography
She was born in 1955 in Węglówka, Poland. She graduated from graduated from the Wychowanie Plastyczne, Państwowa Wyższa Szkoła Sztuk Plastycznych ( now: Jan Matejko Academy of Fine Arts) in 1989 and the Malarstwo i Grafika, Państwowa Wyższa Szkoła Sztuk Plastycznych (now: ASP) in 1990.  From 1986 through 1991 she worked as a scenery designer for Teatr Wybrzeże in Gdańsk.

She is a member the Association of Polish Artists and Designers. Her work is in the collection of the National Museum, Gdańsk.

References

External links

Living people
Year of birth missing (living people)
20th-century Polish painters
21st-century Polish painters
20th-century Polish women artists
21st-century Polish women artists
Jan Matejko Academy of Fine Arts alumni
Polish women curators